Young Talkmore Nyongani (born 2 September 1983 in Makonde) is a Zimbabwean sprinter who specializes in the 400 metres. His personal best time is 44.96 seconds, achieved in March 2005 in Pretoria. He carried the flag for Zimbabwe at the opening ceremony of the 2004 Summer Olympics.

Nyongani started running in his rural home of Makonde before he was brought to the capital Harare by the Millennium Athletics Academy, which is one of Zimbabwe's school of athletics excellence.
He then continued to do well and took part at the World Junior Championships in Jamaica.
In 2003, Nyongani was awarded a scholarship and spent time in Dakar, Senegal.
At the moment his kit is sponsored by Japanese sportswear company Mizuno.

Competition record

External links

sports-reference

1983 births
Living people
Zimbabwean male sprinters
Athletes (track and field) at the 2002 Commonwealth Games
Commonwealth Games competitors for Zimbabwe
Athletes (track and field) at the 2004 Summer Olympics
Athletes (track and field) at the 2008 Summer Olympics
Olympic athletes of Zimbabwe
African Games silver medalists for Zimbabwe
African Games medalists in athletics (track and field)
African Games bronze medalists for Zimbabwe
Athletes (track and field) at the 2003 All-Africa Games
Athletes (track and field) at the 2007 All-Africa Games